Curator Mountain is a  mountain summit located in the Maligne Range of Jasper National Park, in the Canadian Rockies of Alberta, Canada. Curator Mountain was so named on account of its central location, as if it were the "custodian" of Shovel Pass. The mountain was named in 1916 by Morrison P. Bridgland (1878-1948), a Dominion Land Surveyor who named many peaks in Jasper Park and the Canadian Rockies.  The mountain's name was officially adopted in 1947 when approved by the Geographical Names Board of Canada. Its nearest higher peak is Trowel Peak,  to the southeast. Curator Mountain is composed of sedimentary rock laid down during the Cambrian period and pushed east and over the top of younger rock during the Laramide orogeny.    


Climate

Based on the Köppen climate classification, Curator Mountain is located in a subarctic climate with long, cold, snowy winters, and mild summers.

See also
 Geography of Alberta

References

External links
 Parks Canada web site: Jasper National Park

Gallery 

Two-thousanders of Alberta
Canadian Rockies
Mountains of Jasper National Park